Kafr Sur is a Palestinian town in the Tulkarm Governorate in the eastern West Bank, located 12 kilometers Southeast of Tulkarm. According to the Palestinian Central Bureau of Statistics, Kafr Sur had a population of approximately 1,254 inhabitants in mid-year 2006. 13.5% of the population of Kafr Sur were refugees in 1997.

History
Ceramics from the Byzantine era have been found here.

Ottoman era
Al-Ras  was incorporated into the Ottoman Empire in 1517 with all of Palestine, and in 
a sijill (royal order) from 941/1535 an unspecified share of the village revenue was given to the waqf for Ribat al-Mansuri (com) in Jerusalem.

In 1596 the village appeared in the  tax registers as being in the Nahiya of Bani Sa'b  of the Liwa of Nablus.  It had a population of 22 households, all Muslim. The villagers paid  a fixed tax-rate of 33,3%  on various agricultural products, including wheat, barley, summer crops, olive trees,  goats and/or beehives in addition to occasional revenues, a press for olive oil or grape syrup,  and a fixed tax for people of Nablus area; a total of  6,100  akçe.

In 1838,  Robinson noted  Kefr Sur as a village in Beni Sa'ab district, west of Nablus.

In 1882 the PEF's Survey of Western Palestine (SWP)  described Kefr Sur as: "A small stone village on a knoll, supplied by cisterns."

British Mandate era
In the 1922 census of Palestine conducted  by the British Mandate authorities, Kufr Sur  had a population of 271 Muslims, increasing in the 1931 census to  559; 553 Muslims and  6 Christians, living in 128 houses. The 1931 numbers included the Bayarat Hannoun and the Arab el Balawin.

In  the 1945 statistics  the population of Kafr Sur was 460; 450 Muslims and 10 Christians,  with  10,926  dunams of land  according to an official land and population survey. Of this, 878  dunams were plantations and irrigable land, 2,644 were used for cereals, while 14 dunams were built-up (urban) land.

Jordanian era
In the wake of the 1948 Arab–Israeli War, and after the 1949 Armistice Agreements, Kafr Sur came  under Jordanian rule.

In 1961, the population of Kafr Sur was  656.

Post 1967
Since the Six-Day War in 1967, Kafr Sur has been under Israeli occupation.

References

Bibliography

External links
  Welcome To Kafr Sur
Survey of Western Palestine, Map 11:    IAA, Wikimedia commons

Villages in the West Bank
Municipalities of the State of Palestine